Conspicuous Service Cross can refer to:
 Conspicuous Service Cross (Australia)
 Conspicuous Service Cross (New York)
 Conspicuous Service Cross (United Kingdom)